The Century's Daughter is a novel by Pat Barker, published in 1986. The novel was republished as Liza's England in 1996.

The book is critical of former Prime Minister Margaret Thatcher.

References

External links
New York Times review

Novels by Pat Barker
1986 British novels
Virago Press books